The KAB-500L is a laser-guided bomb developed by the Soviet Air Force, entering service in 1975. It remains in service with the CIS and post-Soviet Russian Air Force.

Its warhead makes up  of the total weight, of which roughly 50% is blast-effect high explosive. The technology of KAB-500L is also used for larger bombs, such as the KAB-1500L family.

It is also deployed by the Indian Air Force. The primary launch platform is Su-30MKI. This bomb is also used by Royal Malaysian Air Force on its Sukhoi Su-30MKM.

KAB-500S-E
KAB-500S-E is a Precision-Guided Munition (PGM) whose guidance system is based on GLONASS. The weapon can be dropped from aircraft flying at an altitude from 500 meters to 5000 meters and with an airspeed of 500–1150 km/h. The CEP is 7–12 meters. These bombs were used for the first time in the Russian military intervention in the Syrian Civil War in September 2015.

References

External links
Asia’s Advanced Precision Guided Munitions

Cold War aerial bombs of the Soviet Union
Aerial bombs of Russia
Guided bombs
Military equipment introduced in the 1970s